Crypt of Lyzandred the Mad is an adventure module for the Dungeons & Dragons fantasy roleplaying game, set in the game's World of Greyhawk campaign setting.

Plot summary
The module takes adventurers to the lair of the ancient lich Lyzandred, and focuses on puzzles and mind games to a greater degree than most D&D modules of the period.

Publication history
The module was published by Wizards of the Coast in 1998 under its recently acquired TSR imprint for the second edition Advanced Dungeons & Dragons rules. Crypt of Lyzandred the Mad is the second of three adventures in the "Lost Tombs" series for the Greyhawk setting. It is therefore a sequel to The Star Cairns and is followed by The Doomgrinder.

Reception

Reviews
Envoyer (German) (Issue 29 - Mar 1999)

References

External links
 Crypt of Lyzandred the Mad at the TSR Archive

Greyhawk modules
Role-playing game supplements introduced in 1998